Arthur McNalty may refer to:

 Arthur MacNalty (1880–1969), British Chief Medical Officer
 Arthur George McNalty (1871–1958), British Army officer